Retribution is the debut album by German technical death metal band Obscura. It was recorded in August 2004 and released 2 years later in August 2006 on Vots Records. After the band signed to Relapse Records and released Cosmogenesis, they decided to reissue Retribution. The reissue, which was remastered, was released in 2010 and featured bonus tracks plus new artwork.

Track listing

Personnel
Obscura
 Steffen Kummerer - guitars, vocals
 Markus Lempsch − guitars
 Jonas Fischer − bass
 Jonas Baumgartl - drums, cello

Additional personnel
 V.Santura - additional vocals, solo on track 8
 Stephan Bergbauer - solo on track 9
 Matthias Röderer - additional guitar on one track
 Thorsten Bauer - additional guitar on one track
 Martl Bauer - bass on one track
 Orion Landau - design on reissue

Production
 Alexander Krull - producer
 Obscura - producer
 V.Santura - mastering engineer on the reissue

References

2006 debut albums
Obscura (band) albums
Relapse Records albums
Albums produced by Alexander Krull